Peter J. McGarry (1871 in County Roscommon, Ireland – December 29, 1940 in Queens, New York City) was an American politician from New York.

Life
The family immigrated to the United States in 1880, and settled in Long Island City. He engaged in the real estate and insurance business, and entered politics as a Democrat.

McGarry was a member of the New York State Assembly (Queens Co., 2nd D.) in 1914, 1915, 1916, 1917 and 1918.

He was a member of the New York State Senate (3rd D.) from 1919 to 1926, sitting in the 142nd, 143rd, 144th, 145th, 146th, 147th, 148th and 149th New York State Legislatures.

He was Register of Queens County from 1927 to 1932; and Sheriff of Queens County from 1933 to 1935.

He died on December 29, 1940, at his home at 425 Beach 138th Street in Belle Harbor, Queens, after an illness of four days; and was buried at the Calvary Cemetery there. He never married.

Sources
 PETER J. M'GARRY, EX-STATE SENATOR in NYT on December 31, 1940 (subscription required)
 Peter J. McGarry, Former State Legislator and Queens Sheriff in Brooklyn Daily Eagle on December 31, 1940

1871 births
1940 deaths
Democratic Party New York (state) state senators
People from Queens, New York
Democratic Party members of the New York State Assembly
Sheriffs of Queens County, New York
Burials at Calvary Cemetery (Queens)
Politicians from County Roscommon
Irish emigrants to the United States (before 1923)